McDonald Observatory is an astronomical observatory located near unincorporated community of Fort Davis in Jeff Davis County, Texas, United States. The observatory is part of The University of Texas at Austin. It is an organized research unit of the College of Natural Sciences.

The observatory produces StarDate, a daily syndicated radio program consisting of short segments related to astronomy that airs on both National Public Radio and commercial radio stations — about 400 affiliates in all.

History

McDonald Observatory was originally endowed by the Texas banker William Johnson McDonald (1844–1926), who left about $1 million — the bulk of his fortune — to The University of Texas at Austin to endow an astronomical observatory. Edwin Hockaday Fowlkes, step-son of the land's original owner John Chandler Prude, donated the land to the University of Texas to build the observatory. The provision of the will was challenged by McDonald's relatives, but after a long legal fight, the university received about $800,000 from the estate and construction began at Mt. Locke. The then-unnamed Otto Struve Telescope was dedicated on May 5, 1939, and at that time was the second largest telescope in the world. McDonald Observatory was operated under contract by The University of Chicago until the 1960s, when control was transferred to The University of Texas at Austin under the direction of Harlan J. Smith.

Research today at the McDonald Observatory encompasses a wide variety of topics and projects, including the search for and understanding of planetary systems, stars and stellar spectroscopy, the interstellar medium, extragalactic astronomy, and theoretical astronomy. The Hobby-Eberly Telescope Dark Energy Experiment, or HETDEX, is a multi-year undertaking to decode the nature of dark energy. 

Directors
 Otto Struve (1932–1950)
 Gerard Peter Kuiper (Sept. 1947–Dec. 1949, Sept. 1957–Mar. 1959)
 Bengt Georg Daniel Strömgren (Jan. 1951–Aug. 1957)
 William Wilson Morgan (Apr. 1959–Aug. 1963)
 Harlan James Smith (Sept. 1963–1989)
 Frank N. Bash (1989–2003)
 David L. Lambert (2003–2014)
 Taft E. Armandroff (2014–present)

Observatory

McDonald Observatory is equipped with a wide range of instrumentation for imaging and spectroscopy in the optical and infrared spectra, and operates the first lunar laser ranging station.  It works closely with the astronomy department of The University of Texas at Austin while maintaining administrative autonomy.  The high and dry peaks of the Davis Mountains make for some of the darkest and clearest night skies in the region and provide excellent conditions for astronomical research.

The Otto Struve Telescope, dedicated in 1939, was the first large telescope built at the observatory. The summit of Mt. Locke, accessed by Spur 78, is the highest point on Texas highways. The Harlan J. Smith Telescope, also on Mt. Locke, was completed in 1968.

It is operated jointly by The University of Texas at Austin, Pennsylvania State University, Ludwig Maximilian University of Munich, and Georg-August University of Göttingen. As of 2019, after upgrades the HET is tied with the Keck Telescopes as the second or third largest telescope in the world. However, its cost was about 20% that of other similarly-sized telescopes in use today due to its optimization for spectroscopy.

Additionally, The University of Texas at Austin is a founding partner of the international collaboration to build the Giant Magellan Telescope. McDonald Observatory administrators, scientists, and engineers are heavily involved in the endeavor. Director Taft Armandroff currently serves as Vice Chair to the GMT Board of Directors, and has served as Chair.

Telescopes

Currently, the observatory operates four research telescopes at its West Texas site:

  Hobby-Eberly Telescope on Mt. Fowlkes
  Harlan J. Smith Telescope on Mt. Locke
  Otto Struve Telescope on Mt. Locke
  large format imaging telescope on Mt. Locke

A  telescope, formerly used for research, is now used for visitor programs.

Tenant telescopes

The two peaks also host a number of other instruments:

 The  Monitoring Network of Telescopes (MONET) North Telescope on Mt. Locke is a companion to one at the South African Astronomical Observatory in Sutherland, and was built by Halfmann Teleskoptechnik.
 Two  telescopes and one  telescope located on Mt. Fowlkes are part of the Las Cumbres Observatory Global Telescope Network.
 The McDonald Laser Ranging System (MLRS) operates a  telescope on Mt. Fowlkes to perform satellite laser ranging and lunar laser ranging.
 A  Ritchey-Chretien reflector owned by Boston University on Mt. Locke is used for optical aeronomy.
 The  Robotic Optical Transient Search Experiment (ROTSE) reflector on Mt. Fowlkes is used to search for the optical signature of gamma-ray bursts.

Former telescopes

 The  Millimeter Wave Observatory (MWO) radio telescope operated on Mt. Locke until 1988.  MWO was a joint project between the UT Department of Astronomy and the Department of Electrical Engineering.  The site of the dish antenna is now occupied by the BLOOMhouse, the UT School of Architecture's entry in the 2007 Solar Decathlon, which is now used for staff housing.

Climate
The observatory experiences a semi-arid climate (Köppen BSk) with cool, dry winters and hot, wetter summers.
Coordinates: 
Elevation:

Visiting

The Frank N. Bash Visitors Center, located between Mt. Locke and Mt. Fowlkes, includes a café, gift shop, and interactive exhibit hall. The Visitors Center conducts daily live solar viewings in a large theater and tours of the observatory's largest telescopes.  It also hosts evening star parties, every Tuesday, Friday, and Saturday evening which allow visitors to look through numerous telescopes of various sizes in the Rebecca Gale Telescope Park, including the wheelchair-accessible Wren Marcario Accessible Telescope (a Pfund Telescope), and enjoy an indoor program.

Special Viewing Nights, during which visitors can stay on-site (not required for the programs) and view directly through eyepieces on the 0.9 m, Struve (2.1m), or Smith (2.7m) telescopes, are held on a reservation-only basis. Although not available for several years, as of June 2013, the 2.1m has returned to occasional public access.

Gallery

See also
 StarDate
 List of astronomical observatories

References

External links

McDonald Observatory public site
McDonald Observatory at the University of Texas at Austin
StarDate Online and Universo Online
McDonald Observatory Clear Sky Chart – Forecasts of observing conditions
1939 Film of the Dedication Ceremony for McDonald Observatory

Astronomical observatories in Texas
Minor-planet discovering observatories
Buildings and structures in Jeff Davis County, Texas
University of Texas at Austin
Tourist attractions in Jeff Davis County, Texas